Scott William Bradley (born March 22, 1960) is an American former Major League Baseball catcher in the major leagues from  to . He played for the Chicago White Sox, Seattle Mariners, New York Yankees, and Cincinnati Reds. He is the head coach of the Princeton Tigers baseball team.

Early life
Bradley was drafted by the Minnesota Twins in the 1978 Amateur Draft, but did not sign. Instead, Bradley played college baseball for the University of North Carolina at Chapel Hill. In 1979 and 1980, he played collegiate summer baseball with the Chatham A's of the Cape Cod Baseball League. He was selected by the Yankees in the third round of the 1981 MLB Draft, and signed with them.

Playing career

New York Yankees (1984–1985)
Bradley played in nine games during the 1984 season, hitting .286 with 2 RBIs. The following year, he hit .163 with 1 RBI in 19 games. On February 13, 1986, he was traded to the Chicago White Sox.

Chicago White Sox (1986)
Bradley played in nine games for the White Sox, hitting .286. He was traded to the Seattle Mariners on June 26 for Ivan Calderon.

Seattle Mariners (1986–1992)
Bradley finished the 1986 season strong, as his average increased to .302, having hit 5 home runs and 28 RBIs. He had his best season in 1987, when he hit .278 with 5 homers and 43 RBIs. The next season, 1988, Bradley hit .257 with four home runs and 33 RBIs.  In 1989, he stayed very consistent, as he hit .274 with three home runs and 37 RBIs. In 1990, he hit .223 with one home run and 28 RBIs, and was the catcher for Randy Johnson's no-hitter on June 2, 1990.

In 1991, he hit .203 with 11 RBIs.

In 1992 he played in two games, going 0-for-2 before being traded to the Cincinnati Reds.

Cincinnati Reds (1992)
Bradley played in five games with the Reds, going 2-for-5.

Coaching career
After retiring in 1992, Bradley coached in the minor leagues for several seasons.  In 1997, he moved to college baseball, coaching as an assistant to Fred Hill at Rutgers. Bradley also coached major league baseball pitcher Ross Ohlendorf while he was at Princeton, giving him the unique distinction of catching Johnson's no hitter, and later coaching a player Johnson would be traded for. Prior to the 1998 season, Bradley accepted the head coaching position at Princeton.  Under him, Princeton has appeared in six NCAA tournaments, as of the end of the 2013 season.

College head coaching records
The following is a table of Bradley's yearly records as an NCAA Division I head baseball coach.

Personal life
Scott Bradley is the brother of soccer coach Bob Bradley,  and the uncle of professional soccer player Michael Bradley. Both men were on the United States men's national soccer team.

See also
List of current NCAA Division I baseball coaches

References

External links

1960 births
Living people
Major League Baseball catchers
New York Yankees players
Chicago White Sox players
Seattle Mariners players
Cincinnati Reds players
Nashville Sounds players
Greenville Braves players
Buffalo Bisons (minor league) players
Tidewater Tides players
Oneonta Yankees players
Columbus Clippers players
Fort Lauderdale Yankees players
Colorado Springs Sky Sox players
Albany-Colonie Yankees players
Chatham Anglers players
North Carolina Tar Heels baseball players
Princeton Tigers baseball coaches
People from Glen Ridge, New Jersey
Sportspeople from Essex County, New Jersey
Baseball players from New Jersey
International League MVP award winners
West Essex High School alumni